Statistics of Czechoslovak First League in the 1980–81 season.

Overview
It was contested by 16 teams, and FC Baník Ostrava won the championship. Marián Masný was the league's top scorer with 16 goals.

Stadia and locations

League standings

Results

Top goalscorers

References

Czechoslovak First League seasons
Czech
1980–81 in Czechoslovak football